Rajib Dutta can refer to:

 Rajib Dutta (cricketer, born 1971), an Indian cricketer
 Rajib Dutta (cricketer, born 1980), an Indian cricketer